The 2016 All-Ireland Minor Football Championship was the GAA's premier inter-county gaelic football competition for under 18's. 32 teams took part.

The winners receive the Tom Markham Cup.

The defending champions were Kerry who defeated Tipperary in the 2015 final.

Kerry beat Galway 3-07 to 0-09 in the final on 18 September 2016 for their third consecutive championship.

Teams
Thirty two teams contest the championship. New York and London do not participate in this competition. Kilkenny fielded a team in 2016 despite not having participated in 2015.

Format

Provincial Championships

Connacht, Leinster, Munster and Ulster organise four provincial championships. Each province determines the format for deciding their champions and may be league, group, knock-out, double-elimination, etc. or a combination. For clarity, the format is explained in the provincial sections below.

All-Ireland

The four provincial winners play the four provincial runners-up in the All-Ireland quarter finals. Two semi-finals follow and a final which is normally played before the All-Ireland senior final on the third Sunday in September. All matches are knock-out.

Provincial championships

Connacht Minor Football Championship

Connacht Format

All five Connacht counties compete in a straight knock-out format.

Connacht Main Draw

Connacht Final

Leinster Minor Football Championship

Leinster Format

All twelve Leinster teams compete in the preliminary round of the main draw. The six beaten teams enter the losers' section and, after four play-off matches, two teams re-enter the main draw at the quarter-final stage. From the quarter-finals onwards all matches are knock-out.

Leinster Main Draw

Leinster Losers' Rounds 1 and 2

The six beaten teams in the preliminary round of the main draw play-off in four matches. Two teams from the losers' section re-enter the main draw at the quarter-final stage.

Leinster Final

Munster Minor Football Championship

Munster Format

All six Munster teams compete in the three quarter-finals of the main draw. The three beaten teams enter the play-off section and, after two play-off matches, one team re-enters the main draw at the semi-final stage. From the semi-finals onwards all matches are knock-out.

Munster Main Draw

Munster Playoff Rounds 1 and 2

The three beaten teams in the quarter-finals of the main draw play-off in two matches. One team from the play-offs re-enters the main draw at the semi-final stage.

Munster Final

Ulster Minor Football Championship

Ulster Format

All nine Ulster teams compete. The fixtures mirror the senior fixtures i.e. if Derry are drawn to play Tyrone in their first match in the senior championship then Derry minors play Tyrone minors in their first match. Often the minor teams play immediately before the seniors. All matches are knock-out.

The winners receive the Fr. Murray Cup.

Ulster Main Draw

Ulster Final

All-Ireland

All-Ireland Main Draw

All-Ireland Quarter-Finals

The four provincial champions play the four beaten finalists from the provincial championships.

All-Ireland Semi-Finals

There is no draw for the semi-finals as the fixtures are pre-determined on a three yearly rotation. This rotation ensures that a provinces's champions play the champions of all the other provinces once every three years in the semi-finals if they each win their quarter-finals. If a provincial winner loses their quarter final, then the provincial runner-up who beat them takes their place in the semi-final.

All-Ireland final

See also
 2016 All-Ireland Senior Football Championship
 2016 All-Ireland Under-21 Football Championship

References

All-Ireland Minor Football Championship